Variable Cylinder Management (VCM) is Honda's term for its variable displacement technology, which saves fuel by using the i-VTEC system to disable one bank of cylinders during specific driving conditions—for example, highway driving. The second version of VCM (VCM-2) took this a step further, allowing the engine to go from 6 cylinders, down to 4, and further down to 3 as the computer sees fit. The most recent version of VCM (VCM-3) reverted to the previous 3- and 6-cylinder operation.

Unlike the pushrod systems used by DaimlerChrysler's Multi-Displacement System and General Motors' Active Fuel Management, Honda's VCM uses overhead cams. A solenoid unlocks the cam followers on one bank from their respective rockers, so the cam follower floats freely while the valve springs keep the valves closed. The system operates through controlling the flow of hydraulic engine oil pressure to locking mechanisms in the cam followers. The engine's drive by wire throttle allows the engine management computer to smooth out the engine's power delivery, making the system nearly imperceptible on some vehicles. When the VCM system disables cylinders, an "ECO" indicator lights on the dashboard, Active Noise Cancellation (ANC) pumps an opposite-phase sound through the audio speakers to reduce cabin noise, and Active Control Engine Mount (ACM) systems reduce vibration.

The VCM hydraulic circuit control is defaulted open, meaning that the engine has to build up enough oil pressure on initial startup to disable the rear bank of cylinders. A single solenoid on the rear camshaft is activated to close oil pressure to unlock the cam followers, thereby closing the valves. In theory, the closing of all rear bank valves produces an ‘air spring’ effect. However, the reciprocating effect of the piston with closed valves reportedly produces a vacuum condition where oil can get pulled past the piston rings to flood the cylinder. When VCM disengages, the engine then misfires if needing to clear the cylinder of oil. This unique type of oil consumption has led to premature failure of parts like spark plugs, catalytic converters, engine mounts, pistons/rings, and cylinder walls. Newer versions of VCM have been developed to improve system reliability but consumers continue to log complaints.

Owners of vehicles equipped with VCM frequently face vibration problems due to engine motor mount malfunction while ECO mode is enabled. Instead of replacing motor mounts, owners often override the VCM with a bypass mechanism, such as an in-line resistor based temperature override module. This has the effect of the vehicle computer believing that a sufficient engine temperature to enable VCM has not been reached. While this cannot guarantee that VCM will be disabled (e.g. differing climates/load scenarios), it can generally keep VCM from engaging under normal driving conditions.

Vehicles equipped with VCM
 2003 Honda Inspire
 2004+ Honda Elysion V6
 2005–2007 Honda Accord Hybrid (JNA1)
 2005-10 Honda Odyssey (USDM) - EX-L and Touring Models only (J35A7) - 2005-2007 models are equipped with VCM-1 (3- and 6-cylinder operation) - 2008-2010 models are equipped with VCM-2 (3-, 4-, and 6-cylinder operation).
 2011+ Honda Odyssey (USDM) - 2011-2017 models are equipped with VCM-2 (3-, 4-, and 6-cylinder operation) - 2018+ models are equipped with VCM-3 (3- and 6-cylinder operation). 
 2006–2008 Honda Pilot 2WD Models only (J35Z1) - VCM-1 (3- and 6-cylinder operation)
 2008–2017 Honda Accord V6 (except EX-L V6 6MT Coupe) - 2008-2012 models are equipped with VCM-2 (3-, 4-, and 6-cylinder operation) - 2013-2017 models are equipped with VCM-3 (3- and 6-cylinder operation).
 2009+ Honda Pilot (all models) - 2009-2015 models are equipped with VCM-2 (3-, 4-, and 6-cylinder operation) - 2016+ models are equipped with VCM-3 (3- and 6-cylinder operation).
 2010-2014 Acura TSX (V6)
 2013 Acura RDX V6  
 2013 Acura RLX - VCM-3 (3- and 6-cylinder operation)
 2014 Acura MDX - VCM-3 (3- and 6-cylinder operation)
 2015 Acura RLX Sport Hybrid - VCM-3 (3- and 6-cylinder operation)
 2016-2020 Acura TLX V6
 2017 Honda Ridgeline

See also
 Chrysler's Multi-Displacement System (MDS)
 Daimler AG's Active Cylinder Control (ACC)
 General Motors' Active Fuel Management (AFM)
 Variable displacement

References

External links
 CanadianDriver article
 Honda Worldwide | Technology Picture Book | VCM

Engine fuel system technology
Honda

cs:VCM
de:Zylinderabschaltung
fr:VCM
ms:Pengurusan Silinder Boleh Laras
ja:VCM